Harriet is a rural locality in the North Burnett Region, Queensland, Australia.

Geography 
The locality is bounded to the west by Aranbanga Creek. Harriet Creek rises in Aranbanga in the south and flows through the locality to the north where it becomes a tributary of Aranbanga Creek, a tributary of the Burnett River. The locality presumably takes its name from the creek.

Education 
There are no schools in Harriet. The nearest primary and secondary schools are in Gaynah.

References 

North Burnett Region
Localities in Queensland